Milton Snavely Hershey (September 13, 1857 – October 13, 1945) was an American chocolatier, businessman, and philanthropist.

Trained in the confectionery business, Hershey pioneered the manufacture of caramel, using fresh milk. He launched the Lancaster Caramel Company, which achieved bulk exports, and then sold it to start a new company supplying mass-produced milk chocolate, previously a luxury good.

The first Hershey bars were sold in 1900 and proved so popular that he was able to build his own company town of Hershey, Pennsylvania. Hershey's philanthropy extended to a boarding school, originally for local orphans, but accommodating around 2,000 students as of 2016. In World War II, the company developed a special non-melting bar for troops serving overseas. The Hershey Company, known as Hershey's, is one of the world's biggest confectionery manufacturers.

Early life
Milton Hershey was born on September 13, 1857, to Henry and Veronica "Fanny" (née Snavely) Hershey. Of Swiss and German descent, his family were members of Pennsylvania's Mennonite community, and he grew up speaking Pennsylvania Dutch.

In April 1862, Hershey's sister Sarena Hershey was born in Derry Township, Dauphin County, Pennsylvania, and died in 1867 at age 4.

Like many rural young people of the time, Milton was expected to help out on the family farm, and he learned early on of the value of hard work and perseverance. Henry Hershey rarely stayed anywhere very long, and was prone to leaving his wife and child for long periods. Because of this, Hershey had a very limited education with no schooling beyond the 4th grade.

In 1871, Milton Hershey left school for good and was apprenticed to a local printer, Sam Ernst, who published a German-English newspaper. He did not like that kind of work and he thought it was very boring. One day at work there, he accidentally dropped his hat in one of the machines. Because his boss was hot-tempered, he was fired shortly after. He was worried to see how his parents would react. His father asked Ernst to take him back, and he did decide to give him a second chance, but Mattie Snavely, his aunt, and his mother had a different idea. They wanted him to learn the trade of candy making instead.  So, his mother arranged for the 14-year-old Hershey to be apprenticed to a confectioner named Joseph Royer in Lancaster, Pennsylvania. Over the next four years, Hershey learned the craft of creating confections. In 1876, he moved to Philadelphia to start his first confectionery business.

Milton then traveled to Denver and, finding work at a local confectioners, learned how to make caramels using fresh milk. He then went to New Orleans and Chicago looking for opportunities, before settling in New York City in 1883 and training at Huyler's. He started his second business which, while initially successful, lasted only three years, closing in 1886.

Lancaster Caramel Company
Hershey returned to Lancaster in 1883. He borrowed money from the bank to start the Lancaster Caramel Company, which quickly became a success. He used the caramel recipe he had obtained during his previous travels to make candies. Also, from his previous travels, he learned that caramels sell better in bulk, so that is what he did. This company soon became a success when a man from England visited Lancaster. He loved Hershey's candies once he tasted them and placed a big order to be delivered to Britain. Hershey was able to pay off his debt and had money left over to buy more ingredients and equipment.

By the early 1890s Lancaster Caramel Company had grown, employing over 1,300 workers in two factories. After traveling to Chicago for the World's Columbian Exposition, Hershey became interested in chocolate. After a long time of deciding, he took a risk and sold Lancaster Caramel Company for one million dollars to start the famous Hershey Chocolate Company.

The Hershey Chocolate Company
There, he could obtain the large supplies of fresh milk needed to perfect and produce fine milk chocolate. Excited by the potential of milk chocolate, which at that time was a luxury product, Hershey was determined to develop a formula for milk chocolate and market and sell it to the American public. Through trial and error, he created his own formula for milk chocolate. The first Hershey bar was produced in 1900. Hershey's Kisses were developed in 1907, and the Hershey's Bar with almonds was introduced in 1908.

On March 2, 1903, he began construction on what was to become the world's largest chocolate manufacturing company. The facility, completed in 1905, was designed to manufacture chocolate using the latest mass production techniques. Hershey's milk chocolate quickly became the first nationally marketed product of its kind.

The factory was in the center of a dairy farmland, but with Hershey's support, houses, businesses, churches and a transportation infrastructure accreted around the plant. Because the land was surrounded by dairy farms, Hershey was able to use fresh milk to mass-produce quality milk chocolate. Hershey continued to experiment and perfect the process of making milk chocolate using the techniques he had first learned for adding milk to make caramels when he had moved to Drexel Hill.

Philanthropy
Since Hershey and his wife could not have children, they decided to help others, establishing the Hershey Industrial School with a Deed of Trust in 1909.

In 1918, Hershey transferred the majority of his assets, including control of the company, to the Milton Hershey School Trust fund, to benefit the Industrial School. The trust fund has a majority of voting shares in the Hershey Company, allowing it to keep control of the company. In 1951, the school was renamed the Milton Hershey School. The Milton Hershey School Trust also has 100% control of Hershey Entertainment and Resorts Company, which owns the Hotel Hershey and Hersheypark, among other properties. He took great pride in the growth of the school, the town, and his business. He placed the quality of his product and the well-being of his workers ahead of profits.

He was part of a forward-looking group of entrepreneurs who believed that providing better living conditions for their workers resulted in better workers…Milton Hershey conceived of building a community that would support and nurture his workers. Developing the community became a lifelong passion for him.

Hershey built Hershey Cemetery on Laudermilch Road in Hershey, Pennsylvania. On July 31, 1923, Hershey transferred the land into a cemetery for $1.00.

In 1935, Hershey established the M.S. Hershey Foundation, a private charitable foundation that provides educational and cultural opportunities for Hershey residents. The foundation supplies funding for three entities: the Hershey Museum and Hershey Gardens, the Hershey Theatre and the Hershey Community Archives.

The founding of the Penn State Milton S. Hershey Medical Center occurred in 1963 when the board of the trust went to the Dauphin County Orphans Court with the cy-près doctrine (cy près is a French phrase meaning "As close as possible"). It was a gift from the Milton Hershey School Trust to the people of Pennsylvania, with an initial endowment of $50 million and only one restriction—the hospital had to be built in Hershey. The hospital is a teaching hospital, with an annual budget exceeding the initial construction cost.

The Hershey Company has continued his philanthropic ways. The Hershey Company helped start up Elizabethtown College's honors program.

Close call of the Titanic
In 1912, the Hersheys were booked to travel on the ill-fated maiden voyage of the British luxury liner RMS Titanic. They canceled their reservations at the last minute due to business matters requiring Hershey's attention. The cancellation is often incorrectly attributed to Kitty Hershey falling ill, but by this time, she had been ill for several years. Instead, they booked passage to New York on the German luxury liner SS Amerika. The former Hershey Museum displayed a copy of the check Milton Hershey wrote to the White Star Line as a deposit for a first-class stateroom on the Titanic. This copy is now located in the archives of the Hershey Story Museum, which replaced the original Hershey Museum in 2009.

World War II
Hershey Chocolate supplied the U.S. Armed Forces with chocolate bars during World War II. These bars were called Ration D Bars and Tropical Chocolate Bars. The Ration D Bar had very specific requirements from the army: It had to weigh ; it had to resist melting at temperatures higher than 90 degrees, and it had to have an unpleasant-enough flavor to prevent the troops from developing cravings for them. After a year or two, the Army was impressed enough with the durability and success of the Ration D Bar to commission Hershey to make the Tropical Chocolate Bar. The only difference between them was that the Tropical Chocolate Bar was made to taste better than the Ration D Bar and still be as durable. Tropical Chocolate Bars were designed not to melt in the tropical weather. It is estimated that between 1940 and 1945, over three billion of the Ration D and Tropical Chocolate Bars were produced and distributed to soldiers throughout the world. In 1939, the Hershey plant was capable of producing 100,000 ration bars a day. By the end of World War II, the entire Hershey plant was producing ration bars at a rate of 24 million a week. For its service throughout World War II, the Hershey Chocolate Company was issued five Army-Navy 'E' Production Awards for exceeding expectations for quality and quantity in the production of the Ration D and Tropical Chocolate Bars. The Hershey factory machine shop even made some parts for tanks and machines during the war.

Personal life 
On May 25, 1898, Hershey married Catherine Elizabeth "Kitty" Sweeney (b. 1872), an Irish-American Catholic from Jamestown, New York. Hershey and his wife Catherine did not have any children.

On March 25, 1915, Hershey's wife Catherine died of an unknown disease.
In 1919, Hershey moved his wife Catherine's body from Philadelphia to Hershey Cemetery.
In March 1920, Hershey's mother Fanny Hershey died and she was buried in Hershey Cemetery. In late 1930, his father's body was moved there.

Death 
Hershey died of pneumonia in Hershey Hospital on October 13, 1945, at the age of 88.
Hershey is buried at Hershey Cemetery, a cemetery which he built, on Laudermilch Rd in Hershey, Pennsylvania. Hershey's grave is located at Section Spec-Her, Lot 1, Grave 1, next to his wife (Grave 2).

Legacy 
At the Hershey School, there is a bronze statue of Milton Hershey with an orphan boy wrapped in his arms. Below the statue are these words: "His deeds are his monument. His life is our inspiration."

Hershey's birthday, September 13, is one of several competing dates celebrated as International Chocolate Day.

On September 13, 1995, the United States Postal Service issued a 32-cent stamp for Milton S. Hershey, which honors him as a philanthropist, as part of the Great Americans series. The stamp was designed by Dennis Lyall, an artist from Norwalk, Connecticut.

See also
 Milton S. Hershey Mansion
 List of chocolatiers

References

Further reading
 Katherine B. Shippen & Paul A. W. Wallace, Milton S. Hershey. New York: Random House, 1959.

External links

 Hershey Community Archives website
 M. Hershey's Biography by the Hershey Entertainment and Resorts Company
 Biography
 Hershey photo
 Hershey Public Library
 HersheyArchives.org – Image of Catherine Sweeney Hershey in 1910
 Flickr.com – Catherine Hershey archival photographs
 Worldcat.org – Who Was Milton Hershey by James Buckley Jr.
 

1857 births
1945 deaths
American food company founders
American Mennonites
American people of German descent
American people of Swiss descent
American philanthropists
Burials in Pennsylvania
Businesspeople from Lancaster, Pennsylvania
Businesspeople in confectionery
Chocolatiers
Deaths from pneumonia in Pennsylvania
Founders of schools in the United States
Hershey, Pennsylvania
Hersheypark
History of Lancaster, Pennsylvania
People from Hershey, Pennsylvania
The Hershey Company